Sonia Lescaille  (born ) is a retired Cuban female volleyball player. She was part of the Cuba women's national volleyball team who won the world title at the 1994 FIVB Volleyball Women's World Championship in Brazil. On club level she played with Guantanamo.

Clubs
 Guantanamo (1994)

References

External links
http://www.todor66.com/volleyball/America/Women_PG_1991.html
http://www.bestsports.com.br/db/atlpag.php?atl=20848&lang=2

1971 births
Living people
Cuban women's volleyball players
Place of birth missing (living people)